Dysopsis glechomoides is a plant species of the family Euphorbiaceae. It is native to Chile and southern Argentina (Río Negro, Tierra del Fuego).

References

Acalypheae
Flora of Chile
Flora of Argentina
Plants described in 1820